Decisions! Decisions! is a 1971 American made-for-television comedy-drama film starring Bob Newhart, Jean Simmons and Jill St. John.

The film was part of a two-picture deal between Bob Newhart and NBC. It was filmed as two one-hour shots and put together and screened as one film which originally aired on NBC on September 11, 1971.

Plot
The misadventures of a salesman and a sexologist featuring two plot outlines introduced to a studio audience, who then votes to determine which should be developed.

Cast
Bob Newhart as John Hobson
Jean Simmons as Phoebe Masterson
Jill St. John as Andrea Winters
Lou Jacobi as Lt. Ettinger
John Carradine as Railroad Ticket Clerk
Royal Dano as Tex

References

External links
Decisions! Decisions! at IMDb

1971 television films
1971 films
1971 comedy-drama films
American comedy-drama television films
Films directed by Alex Segal
NBC Productions films
NBC network original films
1970s English-language films
1970s American films
English-language comedy-drama films